Michael Christopher Emlyn Jones (born 5 December 1940) is a British historian.

He was born in Wrexham, Wales. He studied history at Oxford, and taught in Exeter, then Nottingham from 1967 to 2002, specialising in French medieval history.

He is a member of many British and Breton historical societies, including the Royal Historical Society (1971), la Société d'Histoire et d'Archéologie de Bretagne (1972), Society of Antiquaries of London (1977), Société d'Etudes et de Recherches sur le Pays de Retz (1985), Society for the Study of French History. He is a member of the Breton L'Ordre de l'Hermine and Correspondant de l'Institut.  He is also a fellow of the Norwegian Academy of Science and Letters.

Most of his works are about the ducal period of Brittany, but since his retirement he has also taken an interest in the local history of Nottinghamshire, especially that relating to Southwell Minster.

Publications
Ducal Brittany 1364-1399: Relations with England and France during the Reign of Duke John IV, Oxford, Clarendon Press 1970, reprinted Sandpiper 1997
The Creation of Brittany: A Late Medieval State, London, Hambledon 1988
The Bretons (with Patrick Galliou), Oxford, Blackwell 1991
Between France and England: Politics, Power and Society in Late Medieval Brittany, Ashgate 2003
Letters, Orders and Musters of Bertrand du Guesclin, 1357-1380, Boydell 2004

In French
 Recueil des actes de Jean IV, duc de Bretagne, (3 vols) 1980–2001 
La Bretagne ducale. Jean IV de Montfort (1364-1399) entre la France et l'Angleterre, 1998.
Les châteaux de Bretagne, Ouest-France, with Gwyn Meirion-Jones, Rennes, 1992
Les Anciens Bretons des origines au XVe siècle, with Patrick Galliou, 1993
Catalogue sommaire des archives du Fonds Lebreton, Abbaye Saint-Guénolé, Landevennec, Nottingham, 1998.
Recueil des actes de Charles de Blois et Jeanne de Penthièvre, duc et duchesse de Bretagne (1341-1364) suivi des Actes de Jeanne de Penthièvre (1364-1384), Rennes, Presses Universitaires de Rennes 1996
 Le Premier Inventaire du Trésor des Chartes des ducs de Bretagne (1395). Hervé Le Grant et les origines du Chronicon Briocense, Soc. Histoire et d'Archeologie de Bretagne 2007
 Comptes du duché de Bretagne. Les comptes, inventaires et execution des testaments ducaux, 1262-1352, Rennes, 2017, with Philippe Charon

References

British historians
Living people
1940 births
Alumni of the University of Oxford
Members of the Norwegian Academy of Science and Letters